Dominik Volek (born January 12, 1994) is a Czech professional ice hockey player. He is currently playing for HC Sparta Praha of the Czech Extraliga.

Volek made his Czech Extraliga debut playing with HC Sparta Praha during the 2014–15 Czech Extraliga season. Volek is the son of former New York Islanders forward David Volek.

References

External links

1994 births
Living people
Czech ice hockey forwards
Czech expatriate ice hockey players in Canada
HC Sparta Praha players
Red Deer Rebels players
Regina Pats players
Ice hockey people from Prague
Vancouver Giants players